Infected Rain is a Moldovan metal band formed in 2008 in Chișinău. They are signed to Napalm Records.

History 
The group was formed in 2008 by guitarist Vadim "Vidick" Ozhog, lead vocalist Elena Cataraga a.k.a. Lena Scissorhands, and DJ Ivan Kristioglo a.k.a. DJ Kapa. They debuted in August 2008 at a concert dedicated to Slayer. Later that month, Infected Rain took part at a heavy metal festival in Crimea, named Red Alert, and recorded their first demo CD composed of three songs ("With Me", "Parasite", and "No Idols"). Also, the group held a number of concerts in Chișinău and Ukraine.

Infected Rain took part at heavy metal festivals like Red Alert 2008, Metal Heads' Mission 2009, RockHausen 2008/2009, Fuckin'FuckFest 3, Big Up! Urban Fest 2009 (where the band took the second place), and Forest Kap 2009/2010. In the summer of 2009, they released the "ЕР2009", composed of six songs (Judgmental Trap, Panika, No More, Escape, Go Away, and Homeless). The combination of female screaming, hard riffs and electronic samples brought to Infected Rain an individual style. In the winter of 2010 they shot their first video, for the song "Judgemental Trap". Then, the band held a number of concerts in Moldova and Romania. 

On 25 November 2011, the group released their first full-length album titled Asylum, and then the band went on a tour in Romania. In January 2012 was released the second video of the band, for the song "At the Bottom of the Bottle". In June 2012 Infected Rain performed on the same stage with well-known bands like Mötley Crüe and Dimmu Borgir. In the summer of 2012 were released two songs with their videos: "Me Against You" (collaborating with Moldova Extreme Moto Cross), and "Stop Waiting". In the autumn of 2013 Infected Rain toured Romania, Ukraine, Russia and Bulgaria, as their first big tour. 

On 15 May 2014 they released a new full-length album titled Embrace Eternity. In the summer of 2014 the group took part at festivals like "FajtFest 2014"  (in the Czech Republic), Maraton Festival, Route68 Summerfest and Rockstadt Extreme Fest 2014 in Romania, where it performed along with groups like Obituary, Behemoth, Sodom, Katatonia, The Agonist, and others. Then the band went into a two-months tour across 12 European countries to support their new album. Next year the band released the songs Serendipity, Intoxicating, Mold, and Fool the Gravity. 

On 20 April 2017 was released a new full-length album titled 86, as American English slang for getting rid of something, ejecting someone, or refusing service, which is also appeared to be the birth year of the lead vocalist Lena Sсissorhands (1986). The album features 11 tracks. The three albums were recorded in a Moldovan studio named Must Music, and were produced by Valentin Voluța and Infected Rain. 

The lyrics for Infected Rain songs are written by Lena Sсissorhands, and they are in English. The music is composed mainly by the guitarist Vidick, with contributions from all other members. As a female frontman, Lena was noted for her tattoos and her strong vocals. She is coached by New York-based Melissa Cross. For her style, Lena was named by local media "the most eccentric vocalist of Moldova".

Members

Current members 
 Elena "Lena Scissorhands" Cataraga – vocals (2008–present)
 Vadim "Vidick" Ojog – guitars (2008–present)
 Vladimir Babici – bass (2008–present)
 Serghei Babici – guitars (2010–present)
 Eugen Voluta – drums (2012–present)

Former members 
 Ivan Kristioglo (DJ Kapa) – disc jockey (2008–2010)
 Andrei "Mednyi" – guitars (2008–2010)
 Vadim Protsenko – drums (2008–2012)

Timeline

Discography

Albums 
 Asylum (2011)
 Embrace Eternity (2014)
 86 (2017)
 Endorphin (2019)
 Ecdysis (2022)

EPs 
 EP Judgemental Trap (2009)

Demos 
 Demo 2008 (2008)

Singles 
 "Stop Waiting" (2013)
 "Serendipity" (2016)
 "Intoxicating" (2016)
 "Mold" (2017)
 "Fool The Gravity" (2017)
 "Passerby" (2019)
 "The Earth Mantra" (2019)
 "Lure" (2019)
 "Storm" (2019)
 "Black Gold" (2019)
 "Postmortem Pt. 1" (2021)
 "Fighter" (2021)
 "The Realm of Chaos" feat. Heidi Shepherd (2022)
 "Longing" (2022)

References

External links 

 Official website
 Infected Rain at LastFm
 Infected Rain on Metal Maidens
 Infected Rain on metalfan.ro 
 Infected Rain on moshpit.ro 
 Infected Rain on Brushvox.com
 Infected Rain on beat100.com

2008 establishments in Moldova
Moldovan heavy metal musical groups
Musical groups established in 2008
Nu metal musical groups
Metalcore musical groups
Alternative metal musical groups
Groove metal musical groups
Melodic death metal musical groups
Musical quintets
Female-fronted musical groups
Napalm Records artists